Khvoy (also known as Khowy, Khoy, and Khūyeh) is a village in Lar Rural District of Laran District, Shahrekord County, Chaharmahal and Bakhtiari province, Iran. At the 2006 census, its population was 2,697 in 602 households. The following census in 2011 counted 2,715 people in 712 households. The latest census in 2016 showed a population of 2,772 people in 783 households; it was the largest village in its rural district. The village is populated by Persians.

References 

Shahrekord County

Populated places in Chaharmahal and Bakhtiari Province

Populated places in Shahr-e Kord County